Alfred Smith or Alf Smith may refer to:

Sportspeople
Alf Smith (footballer, born 1880) (1880–1957), English footballer for Stoke
Alf Smith (Australian footballer) (1867–1936), Australian rules footballer
Alf Smith (New Zealand footballer), New Zealand international football (soccer) player
Alf Smith (Port Vale footballer), professional footballer who played for Port Vale, 1913–1918
Alf Smith (Scottish footballer), Scottish footballer
Alf Smith (ice hockey) (1873–1953), Canadian ice hockey player
Alf Smith (rugby league) (1915–1995), Australian rugby league player
Alfred A. Smith, American National Soccer Hall of Fame inductee
Alfred Smith (cricketer, born 1812) (1812–1892), another English cricketer
Alfred Smith (cricketer, born 1847) (1847–1915), English cricketer
Alfred Smith (Australian cricketer) (1908–1989), Australian cricketer

Other people
Alfred Smith (architect) (b.1850). English architect
Alfred Smith (artist) (1854–1932), French artist from Bordeaux
Alfred Smith (British politician) (1860–1931), Member of Parliament for Sunderland, 1929–1931
Alfred Smith (supercentenarian) (1908–2019), at his death the oldest man in Scotland
Alfred Smith (VC) (1861–1932), English soldier, recipient of the Victoria Cross in Sudan
Alfred Baker Smith (1825–1896), American Union Army general
Alfred C. Smith (1893–?), American lawyer and politician in the Virginia Senate
Alfred Holland Smith (1863–1924), President of New York Central Railroad 
Alfred Lee Smith (1838–1917), member of the New Zealand Legislative Council
Alfred Leo Smith (1919–2014), Native American substance abuse counselor and religious freedom activist
Alfred T. Smith (1874–1939), U.S. Army officer
Alfred Victor Smith (1891–1915), English soldier, recipient of the Victoria Cross in World War I
Alfred W. Smith (1864–1933), American architect
Alfred Wellington Smith (1840–1907), merchant and politician in British Columbia, Canada
Alfred E. Smith IV (1951–2019), Wall Street executive
Al Smith (Alfred E. Smith, 1873–1944), American politician and governor
Brenton Wood (Alfred Jesse Smith, born 1941), American singer/songwriter
Norm Smith (Australian politician) (Alfred James Smith, 1901–1983), businessman and member of the Queensland Legislative Assembly
J. Alfred Smith (born 1931), American Baptist pastor

See also
Al Smith (disambiguation)